The Democratic Progressive Party (DFP) was a right-wing populist political party in Austria. The DFP was founded in September 1965 by former Austrian Trade Union Federation chairman and Minister of the Interior Franz Olah upon his expulsion from the Socialist Party of Austria. The party was known for its leader's antisemitic rhetoric, and received almost 150,000 votes in the 1966 legislative election, in which it failed to win a seat in the Federal Council. The party disbanded in 1970.

References 

Political parties established in 1965
Defunct political parties in Austria
Right-wing populism in Austria
1970 disestablishments in Austria
Political parties disestablished in 1970
1965 establishments in Austria